Alastria is a genus of moths of the family Noctuidae.

Species
 Alastria chico Lafontaine & Troubridge, 2004

Noctuidae